Kokagala is an isolated mountain in the Ampara District of Sri Lanka.

See also 
 List of mountains of Sri Lanka

References 

Mountains of Sri Lanka
Landforms of Ampara District